Kirsten Cooke (born 4 October 1952) is an English stage actress who trained at the Webber Douglas Academy of Dramatic Art, London. Almost all of her acting work has been in comedy.

Early life
Cooke attended Horsham High School for Girls (now Tanbridge House School), a girls grammar school.

Career
She is best known for her role as resistance fighter Michelle Dubois in the British television series 'Allo 'Allo!, produced by the BBC. Before then, she was an occasional member of the ensemble of comedy actors who appeared in Dave Allen's sketches across several of his BBC series. She also starred in several episodes of the BBC children's comedy series ChuckleVision.

Her other television credits include Woolcott, Rings on Their Fingers, The Dawson Watch, The Upper Hand and Down to Earth. She also appeared as a panellist on Blankety Blank in 1984.

External links
 

English television actresses
Living people
1952 births
People from Cuckfield
Actresses from Sussex
Alumni of the Webber Douglas Academy of Dramatic Art
English stage actresses
20th-century English actresses
21st-century English actresses
British comedy actresses